Faryab (also Romanized as Fāryāb, Fāreyāb, and Fāriāb; also known as Fariyab Varadi and Fāryāb-e Varādī) is a village in Mohr Rural District, in the Central District of Mohr County, Fars Province, Iran. At the 2006 census, its population was 310, in 51 families.

References 

Populated places in Mohr County